This is a list of Italian Ministers of Finance, from 1861 to present.

List of Ministers of Finance

Kingdom of Italy (1861–1946)
Parties
1861–1912:

1914–1922:

1922–1943:

1943–1946:

Coalitions

Italian Republic (1946–present)
Parties
1946–1994:

1994–present:

Governments

References

Finance